Trichilia surumuensis is a species of plant in the family Meliaceae. It is found in Brazil and Guyana. It is threatened by habitat loss.

References

surumuensis
Flora of Brazil
Flora of Guyana
Endangered plants
Endangered biota of South America
Taxonomy articles created by Polbot